Rina Soldevilla (born 1964 in Huasahuasi, Peru) is a Peruvian writer best known for her Spanish short stories, poems, and novel. Her work has been translated into numerous languages, including English.

Soldevilla has received Awards and recognition for her literary contributions from many organizations including, the International Library of Poetry, the Peruvian-American National Council, and Tauro College. In 2014, she was chosen by El Diario La Prensa as an Outstanding Woman. In addition, Soldevilla was honored by the White House as a leading writer in her community.

Soldevilla's work concentrates on the traditional telling of scary stories, in the manner of her native country. Her work has been well-received by critics and audiences.

Biography 
Soldevilla was born in Huasahuasi, Peru near Lima in 1964 but has since moved to the United States. While in Peru, she worked as a dancer and actress. She now lives in New York City with her husband Enrique and two sons, Karlo and Randy.

Bibliography 
 2001: Cuentos Extraordinarios
 2010: Los Ojos de Ignacio
 2017: La Cuna de mis Poemas
 2018: Tales of the Extraordinary

Awards 
 2014: Outstanding Woman by El Diario de la Prensa

See also 
 Peruvian literature
 List of Peruvian writers

References 

1964 births
Peruvian American
Peruvian artists
Peruvian writers
Living people